Aline Tornare (born 15 October 1981) is a French slalom canoeist who competed at the international level from 1998 to 2006.

She won a gold medal in the K1 team event at the 2002 ICF Canoe Slalom World Championships in Bourg-Saint-Maurice. She also won a bronze medal in the same event at the 2006 European Championships in L'Argentière-la-Bessée.

References

ICF medalists for Olympic and World Championships - Part 2: rest of flatwater (now sprint) and remaining canoeing disciplines: 1936-2007.

French female canoeists
Living people
1981 births
Medalists at the ICF Canoe Slalom World Championships